Graberje Ivanićko is a village in Croatia. It is connected by the D43 highway.

References

Populated places in Zagreb County